Spring Mills may refer to:

 Spring Mills, New Jersey, an unincorporated community in Hunterdon County, New Jersey
 Spring Mills, New York, a hamlet in SE Independence, New York
 Spring Mills, Pennsylvania, a census-designated place in Centre County, Pennsylvania
 Spring Mills, Virginia, an unincorporated community in Appomattox County, Virginia
 Spring Mills, West Virginia, an unincorporated community in Berkeley County, West Virginia
 Spring Mills Historic District, a national historic district located near Martinsburg, Berkeley County, West Virginia

See also 
 Spring Mill (disambiguation)
 Springs Global, parent of the former Springs Mills, Inc.
 Springs Mills Building, a 21-story office tower located in Manhattan, New York City